Oldina is a locality and small rural community in the local government area of Waratah-Wynyard, in the North West region of Tasmania. The 2016 census determined a population of 126 for the state suburb of Oldina.

History
The early postal name for the locality was Upper Moores Plains. Changed to Oldina (an Aboriginal word meaning "snow") about 1911.

Road infrastructure
The C237 route (Oldina Road) runs south from the Bass Highway through the locality and provides access to many other localities. The C239 route (Deep Creek Road) forms part of the eastern boundary and the C235 route (Lorries Road) intersects with the C237 in the locality.

References

Localities of Waratah–Wynyard Council
Towns in Tasmania